Lesbian, gay, bisexual, and transgender (LGBT) persons in Australia's Northern Territory enjoy the same legal rights as non-LGBT residents. The liberalisation of the rights of lesbian, gay, bisexual and transgender (LGBT) people in Australia's Northern Territory has been a gradual process. Homosexual activity was legalised in 1983, with an equal age of consent since 2003. Same-sex couples are recognised as de facto relationships. There was no local civil union or domestic partnership registration scheme before the introduction of nationwide same-sex marriage in December 2017, following the passage of the Marriage Amendment (Definition and Religious Freedoms) Act 2017 by the Australian Parliament. The 2017 Australian Marriage Law Postal Survey, designed to gauge public support for same-sex marriage in Australia, returned a 60.6% "Yes" response in the territory. LGBT people are protected from discrimination by both territory and federal law, though the territory's hate crime law does not cover sexual orientation or gender identity. The territory was the last jurisdiction in Australia to legally allow same-sex couples to adopt children.

History
Prior to European contact, there were no known legal or social punishments for engaging in homosexual activity. Sex seems to have been a very open topic among the Indigenous people. Among the Arrernte people (who live on the lands around Alice Springs), sex plays were particularly ubiquitous, even among young children who would play "mothers and fathers" in a very literal sense. They would typically mimic the sex acts they saw their parents and other adults perform. These acts seem to have been performed regardless of sex. Traditions of "boy-wives" also existed where young boys, typically 14 years of age, would serve as intimate servants of older men until they reached the age of initiation, at which point the young man would have his penis subincised. The Indigenous people did not have the typical Western view of heterosexuality and homosexuality.

The Tiwi Islands have the highest per capita population of transgender people in Australia. 5% of the Tiwi population identifies as transgender (also locally called sistergirls or brotherboys). Similar identities exist among other Northern Territory indigenous peoples:  among the Arrernte,  among the Pitjantjatjara and the Luritja,  among the Warlpiri people,  among the Pintupi, and  among the Warumungu. While largely accepted by their communities, they face higher instances of rape and domestic violence.

Laws regarding same-sex sexual activity
The Northern Territory became self-governing in 1978 and the unicameral territory Parliament, headed by the conservative Country Liberal Party Government, passed the territory Criminal Code Act 1983 in October of that same year. This code legalised some homosexual sex acts between consenting adult males in private, though imposed a consent age of 18 for such acts, as opposed to an age of 16 for heterosexual sex acts. The code furthermore banned homosexual anal sex and similar acts which were done "in public", defined as occurring within the presence of only one or more observer. Age of consent equalisation laws were achieved via the Law Reform (Gender, Sexuality and De Facto Relationships) Act 2003, which went into effect in March 2004.

Historical convictions expungement and apology
The Northern Territory was the second last Australian jurisdiction to introduce legislation providing for a scheme allowing people who have previously been convicted of consensual homosexual sex acts the right to apply to have their conviction deleted, or expunged. Following a story on the subject appearing on Triple J's popular youth radio program Hack, a spokesperson for the Northern Territory Labor Government stated it was soliciting advice on the topic and that "every Territorian has a right to dignity and respect."

On 21 March 2018, the Government introduced a bill into the Parliament. The bill would establish an expungement scheme in line with the schemes in other states and territories. The bill passed the Legislative Assembly on 8 May and received royal assent on 23 May 2018. The law, known as the Expungement of Historical Homosexual Offence Records Act 2018, went into effect on 14 November 2018. The law's passage was accompanied by a formal apology to the territory's LGBTI community for past discriminatory laws by Chief Minister Michael Gunner, which was supported by Opposition Leader Gary Higgins.

Recognition of same-sex relationships

De facto unions
The Northern Territory is one of two jurisdictions in Australia not to offer relationship registries or official domestic partnership schemes to same-sex couples, the other being Western Australia. Cohabiting same-sex couples can be recognised as living in a de facto relationship, which cannot be registered but can be recognised by a court declaration for certain purposes.

De facto recognition was made possible following the Law Reform (Gender, Sexuality and De Facto Relationships) Act 2003 amending the territory's De Facto Relationships Act 1991 to define de facto relationships as "2 persons...not married but have a marriage-like relationship". This definition for the first time in the territory resulted in LGBT people having a mechanism in local courts to resolve property disputes with their ex-partners. Prior to this reform, the non-financial contributions of a same-sex partner to a relationship could not be recognised in the same way as marriage or heterosexual de facto relationships. This could lead in some cases to a non-working partner not being able to obtain an appropriate property settlement. Such reforms have since made it possible for same-sex couples in the NT to have most of the entitlements as married partners. It also provides for de facto partners to make certain legal agreements relating to financial matters between the partners and ex-partners.

In 2009, the then-Attorney General, Delia Lawrie, referred the matter of relationship registers to the Northern Territory Law Reform Committee, who declined to make a recommendation on the form that relationship recognition should take.

Same-sex marriage
Same-sex marriage became legal in the Northern Territory, and in the rest of Australia, in December 2017, after the Federal Parliament passed a law legalising same-sex marriage.

Adoption and parenting rights
Adoption law in the Northern Territory is governed by the Adoption of Children Act 1994. Prior to the legalisation of same-sex adoption in April 2018, the Act stipulated that territory courts "shall only make an order for the adoption of a child in favour of a couple where the man and woman are married to each other and have been so married for not less than 2 years". An informal review of the territory's adoption laws was believed to have been undertaken by then Minister for Children and Families John Elferink in November 2015, though no legislative reforms were made prior to the 2016 general election. Following that election, the territory's first gay indigenous MP Chansey Paech called for the Northern Territory to legalise same-sex adoption, indicating that some Cabinet ministers had already indicated their support to him.

In October 2017, the Government pledged to introduce legislation into the Parliament by the following month which would allow same-sex couples and unmarried couples the right to adopt children. It introduced such a bill to the Legislative Assembly on 23 November 2017. The bill was sent to the Social Policy Scrutiny Committee, which recommended that the Assembly pass the bill. It was approved by the Assembly on 13 March 2018, with independent member Gerry Wood the only MP to speak against the bill. The bill received royal assent on 19 April 2018, becoming the Adoption of Children Legislation Amendment (Equality) Act 2018, and commenced the following day. With respect to the right of single people to adopt, territory law allows this only in "exceptional circumstances".

Northern Territory law makes no mention of commercial or altruistic surrogacy arrangements, making both practices technically legal in the state, however, no clinics provide surrogacy services due to the lack of regulation. Assisted reproductive technology (ART) treatments like sperm donation are small in comparison to other states and territories, though it is believed lesbian couples in the Northern Territory have been accepted by clinics for ART treatments. Female de facto partners of pregnant women are treated under territory law as legal parents of any children born as a result of that birth.

On March 31, 2022 the “Surrogacy Bill 2022” was formally introduced to the Parliament - to legally allow children from surrogate parents and other parental agreements to be enforceable that implies formal recognition on birth certificates (to be uniform and consistent with all other jurisdictions across within Australia). This legally applies to individuals as well as couples of any sexual orientation and/or marital status. Same-sex couples for example, will no longer have to legally adopt their own children - which can take many years of both red tape and court orders. The bill passed the Parliament of the Northern Territory a month later (becoming the Surrogacy Act 2022 formally by the NT administrator) and went into legal effect on December 20, 2022.

Discrimination protections
The Law Reform (Gender, Sexuality and De Facto Relationships) Act 2003 helped remove legislative discrimination against same-sex couples in all areas of territory law – with the exception of same-sex adoption which was eventually legislated in April 2018. The Act removed distinctions based on a person's gender, sexuality or de facto relationship in approximately 50 acts and regulations.

The Anti-Discrimination Act 1992 protects territory residents from discrimination on the grounds of sex and sexuality, amongst a host of other attributes, covering the areas of education, work, accommodation, goods and services, facilities, clubs, insurance and superannuation. Transgender residents are covered under the category of "sexuality", which is defined as "the sexual characteristics or imputed sexual characteristics of heterosexuality, homosexuality, bisexuality or transsexuality". There are exemptions in place for "religious educational institutions", which are entitled to discriminate on the basis of religious belief or sexuality in the area of employment.

Federal law also protects LGBT and intersex people in the Northern Territory in the form of the Sex Discrimination Amendment (Sexual Orientation, Gender Identity and Intersex Status) Act 2013.

In November 2022, a bill passed the unicameral NT Assembly to repeal all religious exemptions for religious based schools within the NT in place since 1996 and to also legally protect both teachers and students within religious schools on the basis of sexual orientation from discrimination. The bill also explicitly includes sexual orientation, gender identity and sex characteristics. The bill is "the most comprehensive and robust" anti-discrimination legislation to ever pass within Australia (along with Tasmania). The bill also repeals outdated terminology, phases and words no longer in usage. In December 2022, the NT Administrator formally assented the bill into law as an Act. The legislation is due to come into effect from 2024.

Northern Territory schools
In April 2022, it was reported by various media that schools within the Northern Territory would soon become "legally banned from using such words of - boy, male, man, girl, female and also woman". The Northern Territory government released "legally based guidelines" for LGBT gender-neutral inclusive language - to be implemented within Northern Territory schools soon.

Transgender rights
Transgender individuals are entitled to have their name and birth certificate amended to reflect their gender identity and transgender status.

Following the federal legalisation of same-sex marriage in December 2017, the Northern Territory followed several other states and territories in updating their laws relating to transgender people. On 29 November 2018, the Parliament passed a bill that removed the requirement for one to be unmarried before being able to apply to legally change their gender. In addition, the bill removed the requirement for sex reassignment surgery to be undertaken before a person's gender on their birth certificate can be amended, and also allows an option for a non-gender specific descriptor ("X") to be registered on a certificate. The removal of the surgery requirement was opposed by radical feminist Anna Kerr from the Feminist Legal Clinic due to the risk that it could be used for "nefarious purposes" by some men. On the opposing side, Transgender Victoria executive director Sally Goldner argued the change would help remote indigenous transgender people (sistergirls and brotherboys), who lacked access to medical facilities. The change was also supported by the territory's anti-discrimination commissioner, who suggested it should have gone further and moved from a medicalised model (where a clinician's involvement is still required) to a self-identification approach to gender. The bill received royal assent on 5 December 2018 and commenced the following day.

Access to trans-related healthcare services is limited in the Northern Territory, with transgender children's families generally travelling interstate to access services. The territory has been criticised by transgender advocates for placing transgender women in men's prisons, increasing the risk of rape, murder and suicide.

Intersex rights

In March 2017, representatives of Androgen Insensitivity Syndrome Support Group Australia and Organisation Intersex International Australia participated in an Australian and Aotearoa/New Zealand consensus "Darlington Statement" by intersex community organizations and others. The statement calls for legal reform, including the criminalization of deferrable intersex medical interventions on children, an end to legal classification of sex, and improved access to peer support.

Besides male and female, Northern Territory birth certificates and identification documents are available with an "X" sex descriptor.

Summary table

See also

Transgender rights in Australia
Intersex rights in Australia
LGBT rights in Australia
Australian Marriage Law Postal Survey
Same-sex marriage in Australia

References

External links

Northern Territory law
Northern Territory